AQAP may refer to:

 Al-Qaeda in the Arabian Peninsula, a militant Islamist group
 Allied Quality Assurance Publications, standards for quality assurance systems that have been developed by NATO